Henry Hardy (14 January 1895 – 17 February 1969) was a football player from Stockport, England, regarded as one of the best players that Stockport County have ever had. He was the first, and to date the only, player for Stockport County to win an England cap. Hardy made 207 appearances for Stockport. He made his unremarkable debut against Cardiff on 4 September 1920, conceding three goals. He then went on the make 170 consecutive appearances for the club before he missed his first County game, a 1–1 draw with Southampton on 11 October 1924, due to his involvement with the Football League representative side. He also played for Everton and Bury.

He is thought of as County's best ever goalkeeper. His statistics, though, in the Hatters' Division Three (North) championship season in 1922, are remarkable.

Hardy was an ever-present conceding just 21 goals, a club record that stands to this day. He kept 23 clean sheets in his 38 games, which included a quite incredible 20 from his side's opening 27 games of the campaign

Hardy held the club's individual goalkeeping record for not conceding a goal for an amazing 85 years til it was beaten by current Welsh International goalkeeper Wayne Hennessey. When Blackpool's Barrass scored a 77-minute goal at Edgeley Park on 30 April 1921 Hardy was not beaten again until Tommy Robson scored an own goal at Southport on 8 October 1921 – 755 minutes later.

References 

"Biography About Harry Harding"
England profile

1895 births
1969 deaths
Footballers from Stockport
English footballers
England international footballers
Stockport County F.C. players
Everton F.C. players
Bury F.C. players
Association football goalkeepers
English Football League players
English Football League representative players